Eleazar of Modi'im was a Jewish scholar of the second tannaitic generation (1st and 2nd centuries), disciple of Johanan ben Zakkai, and contemporary of Joshua ben Hananiah and Eliezer ben Hyrcanus.

Rabbinic career
Eleazar of Modi'im was an expert aggadist and frequently discussed exegetical topics with his distinguished contemporaries. Gamaliel II often deferred to Eleazar's interpretations, admitting, "The Moda'i's views are still indispensable".

Few of his teachings are preserved in  halakha and most of what is known about him comes from hearsay. As he lived through the Hadrianic persecutions and the Bar Kokba insurrection, many of his homilies refer, explicitly or implicitly, to existence under such conditions. Eleazar expressed his confidence in Providence in this comment on the biblical statement (Exodus 16:4), "the people shall go out, and gather a certain rate every day" (lit. "the portion of the day on its day," דבר יום ביומו): "He who creates the day creates its sustenance." From this verse he also argued, "He who is possessed of food for the day, and worries over what he may have to eat the next day, is wanting in faith; therefore the Bible adds [ib.], 'that I may prove them, whether they will walk in my law, or not'".

Eleazar's final days were during the insurrection headed by Bar Kochba. According to rabbinic tradition, he died in the besieged city of Betar:

The story adds that a bat ḳol (heavenly voice) thereupon pronounced the immediate doom of the chief of the insurrection and of the beleaguered city, which soon came to pass.

References

Jewish Encyclopedia bibliography 
 W. Bacher, Ag. Tan. i. 194;
 Brüll, Mebo ha-Mishnah, i. 130;
 Z. Frankel, Darke ha-Mishnah, p. 127;
 Hamburger, R. B. T. ii. 161;
 Heilprin, Seder ha-Dorot, ii., s.v.;
 Weiss, Dor, ii. 130;
 Zacuto, Yuḥasin, ed. Filipowski, p. 33a.

1st-century rabbis
Mishnah rabbis
Pirkei Avot rabbis